Mial Eben Lilley (May 30, 1850 – February 28, 1915) was a Republican member of the U.S. House of Representatives from Pennsylvania.

He was born in Canton, Pennsylvania. He worked as a blacksmith several years.

He studied law in Canton, was admitted to the bar in 1880 and commenced practice in Towanda, Pennsylvania.  For several years he was chairman of the Republican committee of Bradford County, Pennsylvania. He was elected prothonotary of Bradford County in 1893 and reelected in 1896.  He was appointed assistant United States district attorney for the middle district of Pennsylvania in 1903.

Lilley was elected as a Republican to the Fifty-ninth Congress. He was an unsuccessful candidate for reelection in 1906. He engaged in the practice of his profession until his death in Towanda in 1915, aged 64; he was interred in Oak Hill Cemetery.

Sources

The Political Graveyard

1850 births
1915 deaths
People from Canton, Pennsylvania
People from Towanda, Pennsylvania
Pennsylvania lawyers
Pennsylvania prothonotaries
American blacksmiths
Assistant United States Attorneys
Republican Party members of the United States House of Representatives from Pennsylvania
19th-century American politicians
19th-century American lawyers